Evangelista Analco  (or San Juan Evangelista Analco) is a town and municipality in Oaxaca in south-western Mexico. The municipality covers an area of 33.17 km². It is part of the Ixtlán District in the Sierra Norte de Oaxaca region.

As of 2005, the municipality had a total population of 412.

References

External links

Municipalities of Oaxaca